Finnish Metal Expo was a heavy metal fair and festival held annually at Kaapelitehdas in Ruoholahti, Helsinki, Finland from 2005 to 2012. It was a part of the Helsinki Metal Meeting. Its original location was the Cablefactory in Helsinki, Finland. 

Mark Groman of Braveworlds writes:

"In addition to discussing global improvements for touring, marketing and promoting the music, FME introduces outsiders to homegrown talent, while entertaining the natives with top-flight international bands."

2005 lineup
Agonizer
Amoral
Callisto
Codeon
Finntroll
Godsplague
Hevein
Kill the Romance
Machine Men
Mnemic
Pain Confessor
Purity
SinKing
Sonata Arctica
Tarot
Teräsbetoni
The Scourger
Total Devastation
Velcra

2006 lineup
45 Degree Woman
Ajattara
Amorphis
ANJ
Bloodpit
Ensiferum
Evergrey
Kotipelto
Pain Confessor
SinKing
Swallow the Sun
U.D.O.
Verjnuarmu
Waltari
Winterborn

2007 lineup
Amon Amarth
April
Battlelore
Before the Dawn
Brother FireTribe
Cyan Velvet Project
Coldworker
DragonForce
Insomnium
Misery Inc.
Moonsorrow
Rytmihäiriö
Suburban Tribe
Tacere
Turmion Kätilöt

2008 lineup
Amberian Dawn
Ari Koivunen
Cause for Effect
Discard
Kiuas
Korpiklaani
Municipal Waste
Mustasch
Norther
Soilwork
Sotajumala
Stam1na
The Scourger
The Sorrow
Turisas

2009 lineup
Alestorm
Ancara
Andre Matos
Before the Dawn
Black Dahlia Murder
Blake
Chaosweaver
Ensiferum
Grendel
Grand Magus
Legion of the Damned
Medeia
Misery Index
Profane Omen

2010 lineup

 Satyricon
 Hypocrisy
 Sonata Arctica
 Apocalyptica
 Insomnium
 Korpiklaani
 jumpmetalcorejumppers
 Doom Unit

References

External links

Official website

Annual fairs
Heavy metal festivals in Finland
Music festivals established in 2005
Festivals in Helsinki
Fairs in Finland
Winter events in Finland